The 5th Platino Awards was presented at Gran Tlachco Theater in Riviera Maya, Mexico on April 29, 2018 to honour the best in Ibero-American films of 2017. The ceremony was televised in Latin America by TNT, and hosted by Mexican actor Eugenio Derbez.

A Fantastic Woman received the most nominations with nine.

Winners and nominees
The winners and nominees are listed as follows:

Honorary Platino
 Adriana Barraza

Performers

References

External links
 Official site

5
Platino Awards
2018 in Mexico